Paliad, also spelled Paliyad, is a village located in the district of Gandhinagar, Gujarat, western India.

Education 

There are  primary, secondary and higher secondary schools in the village: 
Paliyad Gujarati Shala, Shri paliyad madhyamik and ucchatar madhayamik highschool and Shree sarswati vidhyalaya paliyad

Healthcare 

The S. J. Patel Sarvajanik Hospital serves the medical needs of the residents of the village. Many residents of surrounding villages also take the benefit of this facility.

Temples 

There are several major temples scattered throughout the village.
 BAPS Swaminarayan Mandir Paliad
 Varahi Mata Temple
 Ramji Temple (newly renovated)
 Ambaji Temple
 Gayatri Temple
 Mahakali Temple
 Mahadev Temple
 Khodiyar Temple
Jhogani  Temple
 In Paliyad Raval Kuldevi Temple - Kuldevi Name Sullai Maa.....as Paresh Raval is from Paliyad...

Famous Locals 
 
Patel Bumikaben Nitinbhai  Sarpanch
 Arvindbhai Gandabhai Patel (MLA 2017 GUJARAT ASSEMBLY - Dalal)
 Hiral Patel is well-known cricketer in Canadian cricket team.
 Indian actor and comedian Paresh Rawal was born in Paliad
 Manilal Patel
 Patel is a last name is the most population in this village but half of Patel lives out of India mostly in the USA.
 Suresh Patel (MLA 2017 Mansa constituency )
 Paresh Rawal (actor)
Gandhinagar